The Third Coast International Audio Festival (TCIAF or TCF), based in Chicago, curates audio stories from around the world and showcases them in various mediums. It is informally referred to as the "Sundance of Radio".

The festival was affiliated with Chicago Public Radio station WBEZ and features a weekly radio show and podcast, a national broadcast, occasional competitions and challenges, and public listening events. Speakers at TCIAF's annual conference have included Jay Allison, Jad Abumrad, Joe Frank, Ira Glass, Robert Krulwich, the Kitchen Sisters, and Nancy Updike.

The term Third Coast refers to the idea that while the U.S. population tends to be concentrated near the east and west coasts, Chicago, lying on the shores of Lake Michigan, is the country's third largest city.

The festival is associated with the Re:sound audio programs.

References

External links
The Third Coast International Audio Festival Web Site

Public radio in the United States
Mass media in Chicago
Festivals in Chicago